F. W. Benson may refer to:
 Frank W. Benson (politician) (1858–1911), governor of Oregon 
 Frank Weston Benson (1862–1951), American artist